Pestis may refer to:
 Plague (disease)
 Yersinia pestis, a Gram-negative rod-shaped bacterium species
 Pestilence (disambiguation)
 Pestis (Roman mythology), the daemon/personification of pestilence, plague, illness, sickness and disease
 Phthisis, one of the Nosoi or Pestis
 Scrutinium Pestis, a 1658 book by Athanasius Kircher

Places 
 Pestiš, a village in the municipality of Prokuplje, Serbia
 Peștiș, a village in Aleșd town, Bihor County, Romania
 Peștiș (Cerna), a tributary of the Cerna in Hunedoara County, Romania
 Peștiș (Mureș), a tributary of the Mureș in Arad and Timiș Counties, Romania

See also 
 Nosology, a branch of medicine that deals with classification of diseases